The 1930–31 İstanbul Football League season was the 23rd season of the league. Galatasaray SK won the league for the 11th time.

Season

References
 Erdoğan Arıpınar; Tevfik Ünsi Artun, Cem Atabeyoğlu, Nurhan Aydın, Ergun Hiçyılmaz, Haluk San, Orhan Vedat Sevinçli, Vala Somalı (June 1992). Türk Futbol Tarihi (1904-1991) vol.1, Page(47), Türkiye Futbol Federasyonu Yayınları.

Istanbul Football League seasons
Turkey
Istanbul